Naga or NAGA may refer to:

Mythology
 Nāga, a serpentine deity or race in Hindu, Buddhist and Jain traditions
 Naga Kingdom, in the epic Mahabharata
 Phaya Naga, mythical creatures believed to live in the Laotian stretch of the Mekong River
 Naga, another name for Bakunawa, a sea serpent deity in Filipino mythology

Clans and ethnic groups
 Naga people, an ethnic group of northeast India and northwest Burma
 Nagas of Padmavati, a royal dynasty of the 3–4 centuries AD
 Naga Rajputs, a group of Rajput clans
 Naga people (Lanka), an ancient tribe of Sri Lanka
 Naga Sadhus, Hindu ascetics of the Himalayas

Hot peppers
 Naga Morich
 Bhut jolokia
 Naga Viper pepper

Organizations
 Naga Regiment, an infantry regiment of the Indian Army
 North American Grappling Association
 North American Guqin Association
 National African American Gun Association

People
 Prince Naga (c. 8th century), Japanese prince
 Tarek Naga (born 1953), Egyptian architect
 Nagarjuna (actor) (born 1959), Indian film actor
 Kal Naga (born 1966), Egyptian actor, director and producer
 Naga Munchetty (born 1975), English journalist and television presenter
  (born 1983), Indonesian male singer known as Naga
 Naga Kiran (born 1983), Indian actor
 Alobo Naga (born 1984), Indian singer and songwriter
 Naga Chaitanya (born 1986), Indian film actor
 Naga (director), Indian television and film director

Places
 Kampung Naga, West Java, Indonesia
 Naga, Camarines Sur, Philippines
 Naga, Cebu, Philippines
 Naga District, Mie, Japan
 Naga District, Wakayama, Japan
 Naga Hills on the India-Myanmar border
 Naga Hills District or Hkamti District in Burma
 Nagaland in Asia
 Naga, Wakayama, a town in Japan
 Naga, Zamboanga Sibugay, Philippines
 Naga River, river in Philippines
 Naqa (alternative spelling Naga), a ruined city and archaelogic site in Sudan

Arts and media

Fictional characters
 Naga (Marvel Comics), a supervillain in the Marvel Universe
 Naga the Serpent, a character in the Slayers media franchise
 Naga, a character in the video game and anime series Monster Rancher
 Naga Sadow, a Sith Lord in the Star Wars Expanded Universe
 Naga, the primary antagonist of the anime television series, Bakugan Battle Brawlers
 Naga (The Legend of Korra), a female polar bear-dog character and Avatar Korra's faithful animal guide in The Legend of Korra
 Nagi, the reincarnation of Naga from Fire Emblem: Shadow Dragon and Fire Emblem: Shin Monshō no Nazo ~Hikari to Kage no Eiyū~
 Naga Ray, a character from Uchu Sentai Kyuranger
 Naga, an operator in the video game Call of Duty: Black Ops Cold War.

Other fictional elements
 Naga (Dungeons & Dragons), various creatures
 Naga, a race of Rokugan in the Legend of the Five Rings fictional setting
 Naga (Warcraft), an amphibious race in the Warcraft series
 Naga, a battlecruiser-sized ship class in Eve Online
 Naga, a race of cryptids in The Secret Saturdays
 The Naga Empire, an antagonistic faction in the 2015 action-adventure video game Rodea the Sky Soldier

Other uses in arts and media
 Naaga, a 2003 Indian film
 Naga (album), a 2018 studio album by B.o.B

Other uses
 Naga languages, spoken in northeastern India and Myanmar
 Naga Bikol, the variant of the Bikol languages spoken in Naga, Camarines Sur, Philippines
 Naga fireball, a phenomenon seen along the Mekong River
 Razer Naga, a series of gaming mice by Razer
 NAGA (gene), which encodes the enzyme alpha-N-acetylgalactosaminidase

See also
Naga City (disambiguation)
Nagar (disambiguation)
Nagas (disambiguation)
Nagamma (disambiguation)
Nagin (disambiguation)
Nagini (disambiguation)